Pirovy-Gorodishchi is a rural locality (a selo) in Gorod Vyazniki, Vyaznikovsky District, Vladimir Oblast, Russia. The population was 870 as of 2010. There are 9 streets.

Geography 
Pirovy-Gorodishchi is located on the right bank of the Klyazma River, 7 km southeast of Vyazniki (the district's administrative centre) by road. Lapino is the nearest rural locality.

References 

Rural localities in Vyaznikovsky District